This is a table of notable people affiliated with Ohio Wesleyan University, including graduates, former students, and former professors. Some noted current faculty are also listed in the main University article. Individuals are sorted by category and alphabetized within each category.

Academics
William Hsiao, Class of 1963 – Professor of Economics, Harvard University School of Public Health
Alexander Brown Mackie, 1916 – founder of Brown Mackie College
Judith McCulloh, B.A. – Folklorist, ethnomusicologist, and university press editor
Edward D. Miller, MD 1964 – Chief Executive Officer of Johns Hopkins Medicine, 1997–2012
Shriram Krishnamurthi, BS 1993 - Computer science professor, programmer, creator of various languages, Brown University
James B. Preston, M.D. - Professor and Chairman of the Department of Physiology at SUNY Upstate Medical University
Ram Samudrala, 1993, PhD – Professor and Chief, Division of Bioinformatics, Department of Biomedical Informatics, University at Buffalo
Robert M. Stein – Lena Gohlman Fox Professor of Political Science, Dean of Rice University School of Social Sciences, 1995–2006
Ezra Vogel, Class of 1950 – professor emeritus, Harvard University; author of Japan's New Middle Class (1963), Japan as Number One (1979), [he Four Little Dragons (1991) and Is Japan Still Number One? (2000)

Nobel Prize winners
Frank Sherwood Rowland, Class of 1948–1995 Chemistry Nobel

Science
Helen Blair Bartlett, class of 1927 - geologist and mineralogist
Hü King Eng, Class of 1888 - physician and second Chinese woman to attend university in the USA.
Hazel Marie Losh, class of 1920 – astronomer and first woman to be a tenured astronomy professor at the University of Michigan; well-known for her love of U-M sports
Gerald Gordon May, 1962 – psychiatrist and theologian
Ram Samudrala, Class of 1993 – pioneering researcher in protein and proteome structure, function, interaction, and evolution; recipient of 2010 NIH Director's Pioneer Award, 2005 NSF CAREER Award, and 2002 Searle Scholar Award; named to MIT Technology Reviews 2003 list of Top Young Innovators in the World (TR100)

Education
Guy Potter Benton – president of Miami University, University of Vermont and University of the Philippines
Isaac Crook, Class of 1856 – president of Ohio University, Ohio, 1896–1898
George Richmond Grose – president of Depauw University, Indiana, 1912–1924
Edwin Holt Hughes – president of Depauw University, Indiana, 1903–1909
Francis John McConnell – president of Depauw University, Indiana, 1909–1912
Benjamin T. Spencer – author of The Quest for Nationality: An American Literary Campaign 
Thomas R. Tritton – president of Haverford College, Pennsylvania, 1997–2007

Sports
John Barry Clemens – former professional basketball player; attended Ohio Wesleyan before being drafted by the NBA's New York Knicks in 1965; had 11-year career with five teams: the Knicks, the Chicago Bulls, the Seattle SuperSonics, the Cleveland Cavaliers, and the Portland Trail Blazers; retired in 1976 with career totals of 5,316 points and 2,526 rebounds
Tim Corbin, Class of 1984 – college baseball coach for Vanderbilt Commodores baseball, coached 2014 and 2019 NCAA Division I Baseball Championship teams; 3x SEC Coach of the year
Scott Googins, Class of 1992 – college baseball coach for Xavier
George Little, Class of 1912 – football coach for University of Cincinnati, Miami University, University of Michigan and University of Wisconsin–Madison; inducted into the College Football Hall of Fame in 1955
Branch Rickey, Class of 1904 – general manager of the Saint Louis Cardinals, Brooklyn Dodgers, and Pittsburgh Pirates; pioneered the farm system and racially integrated Major League Baseball by signing Jackie Robinson for the Dodgers
Keith Rucker, Class of 1993 – nose guard; five-plus seasons in the NFL; played for Cincinnati Bengals, Philadelphia Eagles, Washington Redskins, and Kansas City Chiefs
Phil "Lefty" Saylor, Class of 1890 – pitcher; first quarterback in OWU football history
Olin Smith – former professional football player; played in eight games in the early NFL; played for the Cleveland Bulldogs in 1924
Ed Westfall  – former quarterback and running back in the NFL; played for the Boston Braves/Redskins and the Pittsburgh Pirates

Politics
Horace Newton Allen, Class of 1878 – diplomat
Kathryn Barger, Class of 1983 - Los Angeles County’s Fifth District Supervisor 
William G. Batchelder, Class of 1966 – member of Ohio House of Representatives
Hiram Pitt Bennet – Congressional delegate from the Territory of Colorado; Colorado Secretary of State
 Samuel G. Cosgrove – sixth Governor of the state of Washington
Charles Vernon Culver – U.S. Congressman from Pennsylvania
Samuel Hitt Elbert, Class of 1854 – sixth governor of the Territory of Colorado, 1873–1874
Jo Ann Emerson – US Representative, Missouri, 8th District
Charles Fairbanks, Class of 1872 – Vice President of the United States under Theodore Roosevelt
Arthur Flemming, Class of 1927 – former Secretary of Health, Education and Welfare; served under presidents Franklin Roosevelt through Ronald Reagan; served as president of University of Oregon, Ohio Wesleyan University, and Macalester College
Joseph B. Foraker – 37th Governor of Ohio; U.S. Senator
Paul Gillmor - U.S. Representative from Ohio, 5th District; President of the Ohio Senate
Nehemiah Green – 4th Governor of Kansas
John Marshall Hamilton – 18th Governor of Illinois
Lucy Webb Hayes, Class of 1850 – wife of Rutherford B. Hayes, U.S. President, 1877–1881
Myron T. Herrick – 42nd governor of Ohio
John W. Hoyt – third Governor of Wyoming Territory
John W. McCormick – U.S. Representative from Ohio
Masa Nakayama, Class of 1916 – first female cabinet minister in Japan
Rudolph Schlabach – Wisconsin lawyer and legislator
William E. Stanley – fifteenth Governor of Kansas
George Washington Steele – first Governor of Oklahoma Territory
Shirin Tahir-Kheli, Class of 1961 – Special Assistant to the President and National Security Council
Michael van der Veen, attorney for former President Donald Trump
James A. Boucher, US Representative representing Albany County, Wyoming.

Social activists
Mabel Cratty, Class of 1890 – leader of Young Women's Christian Association in its early days 
Mary King, Class of 1962 – civil rights activist
Mildred Gillars, Class of 1918 and 1973. Broadcaster of Nazi propaganda under the name "Axis Sally" during World War II.  Convicted of treason and incarcerated.

Literature
Eleanor Hoyt Brainerd – novelist and editor of the early 20th century
Mary Bigelow Ingham, writer, educator, social reformer
Robert E. Lee, Class of 1939 – playwright and lyricist
James Oberg, Class of 1966 – expert on space; author; TV personality
Richard North Patterson, Class of 1968 –  author
Imad Rahman – Pakistani-American fiction writer, author of I Dream of Microwaves
Maggie Smith, Class of 1999 - poet, freelance writer, and editor, born in Columbus
May Alden Ward - Class of 1872 – author
Martha Wintermute (1842–1918) – author and poet

Arts and entertainment
Fred Baron, Class of 1976 – producer of Moulin Rouge; executive producer for the BBS According to Bex
Jim Berry, Class of 1955 – national newspaper cartoonist
Matt Furie, Class of 2001 - creator of Pepe the Frog
Jim Graner, attended 1937–39 – weeknight TV sports anchor for WKYC TV-3; radio color commentator for the Cleveland Browns
Clark Gregg,Class of 1984 – actor, director, screenwriter, The New Adventures of Old Christine,"Marvel's Agents of SHIELD"What Lies Beneath, The West Wing, The Avengers
George Kirgo, attended 1944–45 – screenwriter, author, humorist, former WGAW president (1987 -1991), and founding member of the National Film Preservation Board of the Library of Congress
Ron Leibman, Class of 1958 – Emmy and Tony-winning actor, Angels in America, Norma Rae, Slaughterhouse Five, Friends
Wendie Malick, Class of 1972 – film, TV actor, Just Shoot Me, Dream On, The American President, Hot in Cleveland
Robert Pine, Class of 1963 – TV, film actor, CHiPs,  Murder, She Wrote, Hoover vs. the Kennedys, Six Feet Under; father of actor Chris Pine
Art Sansom, Class of 1942 – creator of the daily comic strip The Born Loser
Salman Toor, Class of 2006 - painter 
Trish Van Devere – actress, Curacao, Messenger of Death, Hollywood Vice Squad, Haunted
Melvin Van Peebles, Class of 1953 – actor and director, Sweet Sweetback's Baadasssss Song (1971)
JoAnn Verburg, Class of 1972 – photographer

News
Mariana Gosnell, science journalist and book author
Byron Pitts, Class of 1982 – CBS News correspondent
Kenyon Farrow, Class of 1997 - Senior Editor at TheBody and TheBodyPro; healthcare journalist and equal rights activist

Religion/Ministry
Nathan Sites, graduated in 1859 - Methodist Episcopal missionary stationed at Foochow, China from 1861 to 1895. 
Charles Wesley Brashares, 1914 – a bishop of the Methodist Church
Orville Nave – author of Nave's Topical Bible
Norman Vincent Peale, class of 1920 – author of The Power of Positive Thinking (which sold over 20 million copies in 41 languages); founder of Guideposts magazine; host of the weekly NBC radio program The Art of Living for 54 years; also wrote The Art of Living (1937), Confident Living (1948), and This Incredible Century (1991)
Ralph Washington Sockman – author; host of NBC's National Radio Pulpit, 1928–1962; minister of Christ Church, Methodist, New York City, 1916–1961

Corporate leaders
Daniel Glaser, Class of 1982 – CEO of Marsh & McLennan Companies
Ira A. Lipman, founder and chairman of Guardsmark, later vice chairman of AlliedBarton.
Orra E. Monnette, Class of 1897 – author; banker; co-founder and co-chairman of Bank of America, Los Angeles
James J. Nance, Class of 1923 – industrialist; CEO of Hotpoint, Zenith and Packard Motors; Vice President of Ford Motor Company's Mercury-Edsel-Lincoln Division; Chairman of Central National Bank of Cleveland; first Chairman of the board of trustees of Cleveland State University; member of the board of trustees of Ohio Wesleyan University
Frank Stanton, Class of 1930 – CEO of CBS, 1945–1973

References

People
 
Ohio Wesleyan University people